Australian cuisine is the food and cooking practices of Australia and its inhabitants. As a modern nation of large-scale immigration, Australia has absorbed culinary contributions and adaptations from various cultures around the world, including British, European, Asian and Middle Eastern.

Indigenous Australians have occupied Australia for some 65,000 years, during which they developed a unique hunter-gatherer diet, known as bush tucker, drawn from regional Australian plants and animals. Australia became a collection of British colonies from 1788 to 1900, during which time culinary tastes were strongly influenced by British and Irish migrants, with agricultural products such as beef cattle, sheep and wheat becoming staples in the local diet. The Australian gold rushes introduced more varied immigrants and cuisines, mainly Chinese, whilst post-war immigration programs led to a large-scale diversification of local food, mainly due to the influence of migrants from the Mediterranean, East Asia and South Asia.

Australian cuisine in the 21st century reflects the influence of globalisation, with many fast-food restaurants and international trends becoming influential. Organic and biodynamic foods have also become widely available alongside a revival of interest in bush tucker. Australia exports many agricultural products, including cattle, sheep, poultry, milk, vegetables, fruit, nuts, wheat, barley and canola. Australia also produces wine, beer and soft drinks.

While fast food chains are abundant, Australia's metropolitan areas have restaurants that offer both local and international foods. Restaurants which include contemporary adaptations, interpretations or fusions of exotic influences are frequently termed Modern Australian.

History

Indigenous Australian bush food

Indigenous Australians have lived off native flora and fauna of the Australian bush for over 60,000 years. In modern times, this collection of foods and customs has become known as bush tucker.

It is understood that up to 5,000 species of Australian flora and fauna were eaten by Indigenous Australians. Hunting of kangaroo, wallaby and emu was common, with other foods widely consumed including bogong moths, witchetty grubs, lizards and snakes. Bush berries, fruits, and nuts were also used, including the now widely cultivated macadamia nut, and wild honeys were also exploited. Fish were caught using tools such as spears, hooks and traps; in some areas, the construction of complex weir systems allowed the development of forms of aquaculture.

Resource availability and dietary make-up varied from region to region and scientific theories of bush tucker plants being spread by hand have recently emerged. Food preparation techniques also varied, however a common cooking technique was for the carcass to be thrown directly on a campfire to be roasted.

Native food sources were used to supplement the colonists' diet following the arrival of the First Fleet in Botany Bay in 1788.

Development of modern Australian cuisine

Following the pre-colonial period, European colonisers began arriving with the First Fleet at Sydney harbour in 1788. The diet consisted of "bread, salted meat and tea with lashings of rum (initially from the West Indies but later made from the waste cane of the sugar industry in Queensland)." The British found familiar game in Australia including swan, goose, pigeon and fish, but the new settlers often had difficulty adjusting to the prospect of native fauna as a staple diet.  Meat constituted a large proportion of the Australian diet during the colonial era and into the 20th Century.

After initial difficulties, Australian agriculture became a major global producer and supplied fresh produce for the local market. Stock grazing (mostly sheep and cattle) is prevalent throughout the continent. Queensland and New South Wales became Australia's main beef cattle producers, while dairy cattle farming is found in the southern states, predominantly in Victoria. Wheat and other grain crops are spread fairly evenly throughout the mainland states. Sugar cane is also a major crop in Queensland and New South Wales. Fruit and vegetables are grown throughout Australia and wheat is a main component of the Australian diet. Today there are over 85,681 farm businesses in Australia, 99 percent of which are locally owned and operated.

Barbecued meat is almost synonymous with Modern Australian cuisine, though it is estimated that more than 10% of Australians are now vegetarian.

After World War II, subsequent waves of multicultural immigration, with a majority drawn from Asia and the Mediterranean region, and the strong, sophisticated food cultures these ethnic communities have brought with them influenced the development of Australian cuisine.

Arguably the first Modern Australian restaurant was Sydney's Bayswater Brasserie (est. 1982), which offered Mediterranean dishes with Asian and Middle Eastern influences and "showed Sydney [...] that food can be adventurous without being expensive".  The term itself was first used in print in the 1993 edition of the Sydney Morning Herald Good Food Guide, which placed 34 restaurants under this heading, and was quickly adopted to describe the burgeoning food scene in Sydney in the 1990s.  Leading exponents of the style include Tetsuya Wakuda , Neil Perry and Peter Gilmore.

As of 2014, the term is considered somewhat dated, with many restaurants preferring to call their style "contemporary Australian cuisine" instead.

Fruit and vegetables

Fruit

There are many species of Australian native fruits, such as quandong (native peach), wattleseed, muntries/munthari berry, Illawarra plums, riberry, native raspberries, lilli pillies, as well as a range of native citrus species including the desert lime and finger lime. These usually fall under the category of bush tucker, which is used in some restaurants and in commercial preserves and pickles but not generally well known among Australians due to its low availability.

Australia also has large fruit-growing regions in most states for tropical fruits in the north, and stone fruits and temperate fruits in the south which has a mediterranean or temperate climate. The Granny Smith variety of apples originated in Sydney in 1868. Another well-known Australian apple variety is the Cripps Pink, known locally and internationally as "Pink Lady" apples, which was first cultivated in 1973.

Fruits cultivated and consumed in Australia include apples, banana, kiwifruit, oranges and other citrus, mangoes (seasonally), mandarin, stonefruit, avocado, watermelons, rockmelons, lychees, pears, nectarines, plums, apricots, grapes, melons, papaya (also called pawpaw), pineapple, passionfruit and berries (strawberries, raspberries etc.).

Vegetables
In the temperate regions of Australia vegetables are traditionally eaten seasonally, especially in regional areas, although in urban areas there is large-scale importation of fresh produce sourced from around the world by supermarkets and wholesalers for grocery stores, to meet demands for year-round availability. Spring vegetables include artichoke, asparagus, bean shoots, beetroot, broccoli, cabbage, cauliflower, cucumber, leek, lettuce, mushrooms, peas, rhubarb, and spinach; summer vegetables include capsicum, cucumber, eggplant, squash, tomato, and zucchini. Popular dishes include zucchini slice.

Meat and poultry

Chicken is the most commonly consumed of all meats or poultry by weight, with approximately 47 kg of chicken consumed by the average Australian per year.

 Australians ate around 25 kg of beef per person with beef having a 35% share of fresh meat sales by value, the highest of any fresh meat in 2018–19.

Lamb is very popular in Australia, with roasting cuts (legs and shoulders), chops, and shanks being the most common cuts. Lamb will often form part of either a Sunday roast or a barbecue. It is also commonly found as an ingredient in gyros and doner kebabs, brought by Greek and Turkish  immigrants in the 1960s and 1970s. Australia consumes more lamb and mutton than any other country listed by the OECD-FAO (with Kazakhstan in second place). By way of comparison, New Zealanders average  and Americans just .

Lunch at an Australian pub is called a counter lunch, while the term counter meal is used for either lunch or dinner. Common dishes served at counter lunches and counter meals are steak and chips, chicken parmigiana and chips, a mixed grill (an assortment of grilled meats), and roast lamb or beef with roast vegetables.

Game
Kangaroo meat is available as game in Australia, although it is not among the most commonly eaten meats. In colonial-era recipes, kangaroo was treated much like ox tail, and braised until tender forming a rich gravy. It is available today in various cuts and sausages. Kangaroo is, however, a common commercial dog food in Australia.

Other less commonly eaten forms of game are emu and crocodile.

Fish and seafood

Seafood consumption is increasing, but it is less common in the Australian diet than poultry and beef. 
Australian cuisine features Australian seafood such as southern bluefin tuna, King George whiting, Moreton Bay bugs, mud crab, jewfish, dhufish (Western Australia) and yabby. Australia is one of the largest producers of abalone and rock lobster.

Fish and chips is a take-away food that originated in the United Kingdom and remains popular in Australia. It generally consists of battered deep-fried fish with deep-fried chipped (slab-cut) potatoes. Rather than cod which is more common in the UK, the most popular fish at Australian fish and chips shops, at least in southern Australian states, is flake – a fillet of Gummy shark (Mustelus antarcticus).

Flathead is also a popular sport and table fish found in all parts of Australia. Barramundi is a fish found in northern Australian river systems. Bay lobsters, better known in Australia as Moreton Bay bugs are common in seafood restaurants, or may be served with steak as "surf and turf".

The most common species of the aquaculture industry are salmon, tuna, oysters, and prawns. Other food species include abalone, freshwater finfish (such as barramundi, Murray cod, silver perch), brackish water or marine finfish (such as barramundi, snapper, yellowtail kingfish, mulloway, groupers), mussels, mud crabs and sea cucumbers.

While inland river and lake systems are relatively sparse, they nevertheless provide freshwater game fish and crustacea suitable for dining. Fishing and aquaculture constitute Australia's fifth most valuable agricultural industry after wool, beef, wheat and dairy. Approximately 600 varieties of marine and freshwater seafood species are caught and sold in Australia for both local and overseas consumption. European carp, common in the Murray River as an invasive species, is not considered edible by most Australians despite being common in cuisines across Europe.

Dairy

Ever since the first British settlement of 1788, Australia has had a dairy industry. Today, the Australian dairy industry produces a wide variety of milk, cream, butter, cheese and yoghurt products.

Beverages

Tea
For most of Australia's history following the arrival of British settlers, black tea was the most commonly consumed hot beverage; however, in recent years, coffee has overtaken tea in popularity. Since the 19th Century, billy tea was a staple drink for those out in the Australian bush, such as those working on the land or travelling overland. Boiling water for tea in a billy over a camp fire and adding a gum leaf for flavouring remains an iconic traditional Australian method for preparing tea. Famously, it was prepared by the ill-fated swagman in the renowned Australian folksong "Waltzing Matilda".

Tea and biscuits or freshly home-baked scones are common for afternoon tea between friends and family.

Coffee

Today's Australia has a distinct coffee culture. The coffee industry has grown from independent cafes since the early 20th century. The flat white first became popular in Australia, and its invention is claimed by a Sydneysider. The iconic Greek cafés of Sydney and Melbourne were the first to introduce locally roasted coffees in 1910. 

In 1952, the first espresso machines began to appear in Australia and a plethora of fine Italian coffee houses were emerging in Melbourne and Sydney. Pellegrini's Espresso Bar and Legend Café often lay claim to being Melbourne's first 'real' espresso bars, opening their doors in 1954 and 1956 respectively. This decade also saw the establishment of one of Australia's most iconic coffee brands, Vittoria, which remains the country's largest coffee maker and distributor. The brand has existed in Australia since 1958, well before it moved to the US.

To this day, international coffee chains such as Starbucks have very little market share in Australia, with Australia's long established independent cafés existing along with homegrown franchises such as The Coffee Club, Michel's Patisserie, Dôme in WA, and Zarraffas Coffee in Queensland. One reason for this is that unlike with the United States and Asia, Australia for many decades had already had an established culture of independent cafés before coffee chains tried to enter the market.

Other hot beverages
The chocolate and malt powder Milo, which was developed by Thomas Mayne in Sydney in 1934 in response to the Great Depression, is mixed with cold or hot milk to produce a popular beverage. In recent years, Milo has been exported and is also commonly consumed in Southeast Asia even becoming a major ingredient in some desserts produced in the region.

Alcohol

Beer in Australia has been popular since colonial times. James Squire is considered to have founded Australia's first commercial brewery in 1798 and the Cascade Brewery in Hobart, Tasmania, has been operating since the early 19th century. Since the 1970s, Australian beers have become increasingly popular globally – with Fosters lager being an iconic export brand. However, Fosters is not a large seller on the local market, with alternatives such as Victoria Bitter & Carlton Draught outselling the popular export. Craft beer is popular, as well as distinctive products from smaller breweries such as Coopers and Little Creatures.

The Australian wine industry is the fifth largest exporter of wine around the world, with 760 million litres a year to a large international export market and contributes $5.5 billion per annum to the nation's economy. Australians consume over 530 million litres annually with a per capita consumption of about 30 litres – 50% white table wine, 35% red table wine. Wine is produced in every state, with more than 60 designated wine regions totalling approximately 160,000 hectares. Australia's wine regions are mainly in the southern, cooler parts of the country, in South Australia, New South Wales, Victoria, and Western Australia. Amongst the most famous wine districts are the Hunter Region, Margaret River, Yarra Valley, and Barossa Valley and among the best known wine producers are Penfolds, Rosemount Estate, Wynns Coonawarra Estate and Lindeman's. In Australia's tropical regions, wine is produced from exotic fruits such as mango, passion fruit and lychees.

In modern times, South Australia has also become renowned for its growing number of premium spirits producers, with the South Australian Spirits industry quickly emerging as a world leader with producers being recognised globally such as Seppeltsfield Road Distillers, Never Never Distilling, Adelaide Hills Distilling and many more.

Rum served as a currency during the late 18th and early 19th centuries in Australia when metallic currency was in short supply.

Take-away and convenience foods  

The traditional places to buy take-away food in Australia has long been at a local milk bar, fish and chip shop, or bakery, though these have met with stiff competition from fast food chains and convenience stores in recent decades.

Iconic Australian take-away food (i.e. fast food) includes meat pies, sausage rolls, pasties, Chiko Rolls, and dim sims. Meat pies, sausage rolls, and pasties are often found at milk bars, bakeries, and petrol stations, often kept hot in a pie warmer or needing to be microwaved; meat pies are also a staple at AFL football matches. Chiko rolls, dim sims and other foods needing to be deep fried, are to be found at fish and chip shops, which have the necessary deep fryers in which to cook them.

The Australian hamburgers and steak sandwiches are also found at fish and chip shops. Australian hamburgers consist of a fried beef patty, served with shredded lettuce and sliced tomato in a (usually toasted) round bread roll or bun. Tomato sauce (similar to ketchup but made with less sugar and slightly less viscous) or barbecue sauce are almost always included. Bacon, cheese and fried onions are also common additions, as is a slice of beetroot and/or a fried egg, with other options including sliced pineapple. Pickles are rarely included, except in burgers from American chains. Steak sandwiches come with the same options, but instead of a beef patty they consist of a thin steak and are served in two slices of toast, not buns.

Commonly found at community and fundraising events are sausage sizzle stalls – a stall with a barbecue hot plate on which sausages are cooked. At a sausage sizzle the sausage is served in a slice of white bread, with or without tomato sauce and with the option of adding fried onions, and eaten as a snack or as a light lunch. A sausage sizzle at a polling station on any Australian state or Federal election day has humorously become known as a Democracy sausage.

The Halal Snack Pack, ("HSP", also known in South Australia as an AB) originated in Australia as a fusion of Middle Eastern and European flavours, common at kebab shops around Australia. It consists of doner kebab meat served over hot chips and covered in sauces (such as chilli, garlic, or barbecue sauce).

Baked goods and desserts 
Damper is a traditional Australian soda bread prepared by swagmen, drovers and other travellers. It is a wheat flour based bread, traditionally baked in the coals of a campfire. Toast is commonly eaten at breakfast. An iconic commercial spread is Vegemite – this is a salty, B vitamin-rich savoury spread made from brewers yeast eaten on buttered toast, commonly at breakfast, or in sandwiches. A common children's treat dating back to the 1920s is fairy bread.

A classic Australian biscuit is the ANZAC biscuit, which are often homemade and so-called as they were sent by families and friends to Australian soldiers fighting in Europe and the Dardanelles in the First World War. A popular commercial brand of biscuit are Arnott's Tim Tams.

A classic Australian cake is the lamington, made from two squares of butter cake or sponge cake coated in an outer layer of chocolate sauce and rolled in desiccated coconut. Another popular cake and dessert dish is the pavlova, a meringue-based dessert, however the origins of this are contested as New Zealand also lays claim to its invention.

The mango pancake, a stable of Yum Cha restaurants in Sydney and elsewhere in Australia, is believed to have originated in Sydney in the late 1980s and early 1990s.

Regional foods

As well as national icons there are many regional iconic foods.

South Australia has FruChocs, King George whiting, and a range of food of German origin including mettwurst, Bienenstich (beesting), streuselkuchen (German cake) and fritz. The state has its own iconic brands such as Farmers Union Iced Coffee, YoYo biscuits, Balfours frog cakes. Jubilee cake is a specialty of South Australia. In Adelaide, a variant on the meat pie is the pie floater, which is a meat pie served in a bowl of pea soup.

Victoria is famous for its home-grown Melbourne invention, the dim sim. Melbourne is also the home of the hot jam donut. Tasmania has leatherwood honey,  abalone, and savoury toast. Queensland has Weis Fruit Bar and claims the lamington.

Cities

Brisbane
The cuisine of Brisbane derives from mainstream Australian cuisine, as well as many cuisines of international origin. Major native foods of the Brisbane region and commonly used in local cuisine include; the macadamia, lemon-scented myrtle, Australian finger lime, bunya nut, and Moreton Bay bug. The city's cuisine culture is often described as casual with an emphasis on outdoor dining. Roof-top dining has become an iconic part of the culinary landscape, as well as a large street food scene with food trucks and pop-up bars common. Brisbane also lays claim to several foods including "smashed avo"; although popularized in Sydney in the 1990s, smashed avocado was a common dish in Brisbane and Queensland dating back to the 1920s. Brisbane also claims the Lamington and the Conut.

See also

List of Australian and New Zealand dishes
 Australian wine
Australian whisky
 Chinese restaurants in Australia
 Culture of Australia
 Modern Australian cuisine
 Bush tucker
 Cuisine of Brisbane
 Australian Aboriginal sweet foods

References

Further reading

 Newling, J., 2015. Eat Your History: Stories and Recipes from the Australian Kitchen. Sydney Living Museums.
 O'Brien, C., 2016. The Colonial Kitchen: Australia 1788–1901. Rowman & Littlefield.
 O'Connell, J., 2017. A Timeline of Australian Food: From Mutton to Masterchef. NewSouth Publishing.
 Santich, B., 2006. "The high and the low: Australian cuisine in the late nineteenth and early twentieth centuries". Journal of Australian studies, 30 (87), pp. 37–49.

External links

Australian food and drink – Native Australians and early settlers
Australian Flavour – Recipes verified as having been cooked in Australian in the late 1800s and 1900s plus others considered iconic